Justice Tucker may refer to:

Henry St. George Tucker Sr. (1780–1848), justice of the Court of Appeals of Virginia
St. George Tucker (1752–1827), justice of the Court of Appeals of Virginia

See also
Judge Tucker (disambiguation)